Frederick Coffay Yohn (February 8, 1875 – June 5 or 6, 1933), often recognized only by his initials, F. C. Yohn, was an American artist and magazine illustrator.

Background
Yohn's work appeared in publications including Scribner's Magazine, Harper's Magazine, and Collier's Weekly. Books he illustrated included Jack London's A Daughter of the Snows, Frances Hodgson Burnett's The Dawn of a To-morrow and Henry Cabot Lodge's Story of the American Revolution.  He studied at the Indianapolis Art School during his first student year and then studied at the Art Students League of New York under Henry Siddons Mowbray (1858–1928).  Mowbray studied at the Atelier of Léon Bonnat in Paris. Yohn often specialized in historical military themes, especially of the American Revolution, as well as the First World War. He designed the 2-cent US Postal Service stamp in 1929 to commemorate the 150th Anniversary of George Rogers Clark's Victory over the British at Sackville. He is best known for his painting of George Washington at Valley Forge.

Gallery

References

External links

 
 
Photograph of Yohn (from Smithsonian collections)

1875 births
1933 deaths
Artists from Indianapolis
19th-century American painters
19th-century American male artists
American male painters
20th-century American painters
20th-century American male artists
American illustrators
Painters from Indiana